Kala Amb is the industrial capital of the  Sirmaur district in Himachal Pradesh. It is a small town and an industrial area in Sirmour District in the state of Himachal Pradesh, India. 

At present Kalaamb is an emerging town for industries as it hosts production units for paper, metal, chemicals, thread mills and air-conditioners; thus air pollution is quite a concern here.

This town is on the border of Himachal Pradesh and Haryana, hence half of the town falls in Haryana, However the industrial area is situated in Himachal only. Kala Amb is increasing in area due to an increase in industrialization. Now the boundaries of the town have reached until the village Trilokpur which is famous for Bala Sundri Temple in northern India.

Cities and towns in Chandigarh district